Julian Hamati (born 16 November 1992) is an Albanian professional basketball player who currently plays for BC Teuta Durrës in the  Albanian Basketball League.

Hamati started his career in 2012 and has since been a part of the Albanian Basketball League. This year, following his transfer to Teuta he is also a part of the Balkan International Basketball League.

Balkan League statistics

|-
| style="text-align:left;"| 2018–19
| style="text-align:left;" rowspan=1| BC Teuta Durrës
| 14 || 1 || 13.86 || .455 || .000 || .667 || 3.71 || 0.86 || 0.57 || 0.29 || 5.14 || 6.43

References

1992 births
Living people
Albanian men's basketball players
Power forwards (basketball)
Basketball players from Tirana